Roaring River Township is one of twenty-five townships in Barry County, Missouri, United States. As of the 2000 census, its population was 1,396.

The township takes its name from Roaring River.

Geography
It contains three cemeteries: Easley, Munsey and Roach.

The streams of Butler Creek, Cedar Creek, Darity Branch, East Fork Rock Creek, Haddock Creek, Hottle Branch, Johns Branch, Panther Creek, Raridan Branch, Roaring River and Stubblefield Branch run through this township.

References

 USGS Geographic Names Information System (GNIS)

External links
 US-Counties.com
 City-Data.com

Townships in Barry County, Missouri
Townships in Missouri